The 2000 Bedford Borough Council election took place on 4 May 2000 to elect members of Bedford Borough Council in England. This was on the same day as  other local elections.

Summary

Election result

Ward resuls

Brickhill

Bronham

Carlton

Castle

Cauldwell

Clapham

De Parys

Eastcotts

Goldington

Harpur

 
 

 

======

 
 
 

 

======

Kingsbrook

 
 

 

======

 
 
 

 

======

 
 
 

 

======

 
 
 

 

======

 
 
 

 

======

 
 
 

 

======

References

Bedford
Bedford Borough Council elections
2000s in Bedfordshire